Frank Kolb (born 27 February 1945 in Rheinbach, Rhine Province) is a German professor of ancient history at the University of Tübingen in Germany. He has been involved in a controversy over findings concerning the late Bronze Age in Troy, and accused Dr. Manfred Korfmann, a professor who has been leading excavations at the archaeological site of Troy, of deliberately misrepresenting his findings there. Kolb believes Troy was not an important city, but Korfmann (and others) had suggested that it was a significant trade centre.

External links
Projekt Troia

1945 births
Living people
People from Rheinbach
People from the Rhine Province
20th-century German historians
Historians of antiquity
German male non-fiction writers
21st-century German historians
Academic staff of the University of Tübingen